The Moriss Taylor Show was one of the longest-running locally produced television shows in history. Hosted by longtime radio personality and producer Moriss Taylor, the show (based in Chico, California) was a weekly country music-variety staple featuring such musicians as Charlie Robinson, Greg Ecox, Yvonne Ambrose-Haygood, Bill Teague, Mark Alstad, Rosie Mello, Jolene Farrara, Mark Pacheco, and Mel Wilson. Announcer Ron Palmer and news reporter Rick Rigsby also made appearances on the show.

The show started in 1956, three years after the launch of its host television station KHSL-TV. It was produced at both KHSL-TV studio locations on 4th and Wall Streets from 1956-84 and on Silverbell Road from 1984-95. It was broadcast on Channel 12 from 1956-95 and was shown in reruns on KHSL-TV until 1997 when it was cancelled following the acquisition of the station by Catamount Broadcasting.  

From 1997 to 2015, repeats (usually early 1990s shows) aired on KRVU in Chico.  

In 2015, KRVU cancelled The Moriss Taylor Show following an ownership change of the station when they were purchased by Bonten Media Group, then-owners of KRCR-TV in Redding, California, a chief rival of KHSL-TV since 1956.  Episodes can now be seen on YouTube.

References

External links
 Chico News and Review Story on Moriss Taylor (November 22, 2001)
 Chico News and Review Story on Moriss Taylor (November 29, 2001)
 Chico News and Review Story on Moriss Taylor (December 14, 2006)

1956 American television series debuts
1997 American television series debuts
1950s American variety television series
1960s American variety television series
1970s American variety television series
1980s American variety television series
1990s American variety television series
Local music television shows in the United States
Country music television series
Chico, California